Now or Never is a 2003 Italian coming of age comedy-drama film written and directed by Lucio Pellegrini.

Plot 
David is a model student in the last year of the physics faculty at the Scuola Normale Superiore di Pisa; he practically lives in a parallel reality, made up of books and arguments on the highest systems, without any contact with everyday reality. Everything changes when, a few minutes before his last exam, he participates in a student collective to follow the unknown Viola, after the latter had given him a flyer: the exam skips, and with it most of David's certainties. The boy immediately falls in love with Viola, but he is also a good friend of Luca, Viola's boyfriend. The events lead David to participate in the occupation of a social center, and even in pseudo-subversive actions to the point of catapulting the entire group of dissidents in the midst of the violence that shook Genoa in 2001 on the occasion of the G8 summit.

Cast 
 Jacopo Bonvicini as  David
 Violante Placido as  Viola
 Edoardo Gabbriellini as  Luca
 Elio Germano as Doveri
 Riccardo Scamarcio as  Biri
 Toni Bertorelli as  David's Father
 Camilla Filippi as  Vanna
 Francesco Mandelli as  Frankino
 Gabriele Biondi as  Sorcio
 Francesco Bitti as  Bianchini
 Massimo Bosi as  Gom
 Paolo Sassanelli as Lt. Lusotti
 Thomas Trabacchi as Pietro
 Roan Johnson as Goliardo

See also  
 List of Italian films of 2003

References

External links

2005 films
2000s coming-of-age comedy-drama films
Italian coming-of-age comedy-drama films
Films directed by Lucio Pellegrini
2003 comedy films
2005 comedy films
2003 drama films
2003 films
2005 drama films
2000s Italian films
Fandango (Italian company) films
Rai Cinema films